Trunojoyo Airport  is an airport near Sumenep, a city in the Madura Island of East Java, Indonesia. It is named after the Madurese nobleman Trunajaya, who led a rebellion in the 17th century against Maturamish and Dutch forces.

Airlines and destinations

References

External links 
Trunojoyo Airport - Indonesia Airport global website

airports in East Java
Transport in East Java